Ömer Soyer Kalyoncu (born on 16 October 1950) is a Turkish Cypriot politician who was the Prime Minister of Northern Cyprus between 16 July 2015 and April 2016.

Kalyoncu was born in Kyrenia in 1950. He studied chemical engineering in the Middle East Technical University, and took part in student associations during his student life. Upon his return to Cyprus, he became first an administrator, then the leader of the Association of Revolutionary Youth.

He became a member of the Republican Turkish Party (CTP) in 1973, and rose to high positions, including the membership of the Central Administrative Board (MYK). He was first elected to the Assembly of the Republic from the Girne District in the parliamentary election of 1993. He was the Minister of Labor and Social Security between 11 December 1995 and 16 August 1996. He was re-elected to the parliament in parliamentary election of 1998 and parliamentary election of 2003 and subsequently became the Minister of Public Works and Transportation in the CTP-DP coalition till 2005.

In 2011, Kalyoncu ran for the leadership of the party. In an election in the party congress against Özkan Yorgancıoğlu and Mehmet Çağlar, he came second and the election was scheduled to have a run-off between him and Yorgancıoğlu. However, Kalyoncu withdrew as he had previously announced, and Yorgancıoğlu became the leader.

In June 2015, after Mehmet Ali Talat assumed leadership of the CTP, the cabinet under former party leader Özkan Yorgancıoğlu fell. Kalyoncu was tasked with forming the new government. On 9 July 2015, it was announced that the government would be formed with the National Unity Party.

References 

1950 births
21st-century prime ministers of Northern Cyprus
Government ministers of Northern Cyprus
Living people
Members of the Assembly of the Republic (Northern Cyprus)
Middle East Technical University alumni
People from Kyrenia District
Prime Ministers of Northern Cyprus
Republican Turkish Party politicians
Turkish Cypriot socialists
Turkish Cypriot expatriates in Turkey